Izabal is one of the 22 departments of Guatemala. Its coastal areas form part of the homeland of the Garifuna people.

Izabal is bordered to the north by Belize, to the north east by the Gulf of Honduras, and to the east by Honduras, and by the Guatemalan departments of Petén to the north west, Alta Verapaz to the west, and Zacapa to the south.

The Izabal Department surrounds Lake Izabal (or Lago de Izabal), Guatemala's largest lake (about 48 km long and 24 km wide, with an area of about 590 km²). The Spanish Colonial fort of San Felipe, now a Guatemalan national monument, overlooks the point where the lake flows into the Río Dulce.

The small town of Izabal is on the south shore of the lake; before the construction of the ports of Livingston and Puerto Barrios in the 19th century this was Guatemala's main Caribbean Sea port and was the original seat of Izabal department; nowadays, however,  Izabal town is a remote village that gets little traffic.

From the area around Lake Izabal, the Department of Izabal stretches along the Río Dulce to the coast of the Caribbean Sea.

The department of Izabal includes the ports of Puerto Barrios (the departmental seat), Santo Tomás de Castilla, Livingston and Guatemala's free trade zone Zolic. Izabal also includes the Pre-Columbian Maya ruins of Quirigua.

Municipalities 

 El Estor
 Livingston
 Los Amates
 Morales
 Puerto Barrios

See also

 Carlos Manuel Arana Osorio
EXMIBAL
Franja Transversal del Norte
 Jacobo Árbenz Guzmán
José María Orellana
Puerto Barrios
Quiriguá
 Rafael Carrera
Santo Tomás de Castilla
United Fruit Company

References

External links
Interactive department map
Izabal, Green Caribbean

 
Departments of Guatemala